Charles Francis "Barry" Cullen (June 16, 1935 – December 16, 2022) was a Canadian ice hockey right winger who played five seasons in the National Hockey League for the Toronto Maple Leafs and Detroit Red Wings from 1955 to 1960.

Cullen played alongside brother Brian, and his younger brother Raymond followed in their footsteps, going to play in the NHL as well.

Cullen's eldest son, Terry went to play for the Michigan Wolverines, where he was hit from behind and broke his neck.  Barry's fourth child, John Cullen, went on to play for Boston University, and then to the NHL where he played with the Pittsburgh Penguins, Hartford Whalers, Toronto Maple Leafs, and Tampa Bay Lightning. His grandson Paul Cullen also participates in the Canadian Rally Championship.

Cullen lived in Guelph, Ontario where he owned a car dealership, now in its third generation. He died in Guelph on December 16, 2022, at the age of 87.

Career statistics

Regular season and playoffs

Awards and achievements
WHL Rookie of the Year Award (1956)
AHL First All-Star Team (1962)

References

External links
 

1935 births
2022 deaths
Buffalo Bisons (AHL) players
Canadian ice hockey right wingers
Canadian sportspeople of Irish descent
Detroit Red Wings players
Hershey Bears players
Ice hockey people from Ottawa
St. Catharines Teepees players
Toronto Maple Leafs players
Winnipeg Warriors (minor pro) players